Special Collections is a self-contained unit in the University of Pretoria Library Services. The mission of the Special Collections unit is to play a stewardship role in the preservation and proper archiving of its information resources and to ensure their optimal accessibility to the research community.

The unit houses the following collections:

Africana Collections

ZA Collection

This, the largest of the collections, contains publications concerning Africa, south of the Sahara. It covers the whole spectrum of subjects, with the emphasis on historical and heritage studies, arts, indigenous crafts, fauna and flora. The journals include entire collections of such publications as Die Huisgenoot, die Brandwag and Boervrou. The collection is divided into an old (card catalogue) and a new (computerized catalogue) collection which is fully accessible on UPExplore. The new collection is augmented by new acquisitions as well as additions from donations. Various donators, including staff members and alumni, contributed to the establishment and growth of the Africana collection. 

Housed and labeled separately but including many Africana works, are the collections of a number of eminent persons which have been acquired since the 1920s:

Prof J du Plessis

of Stellenbosch

M M Nolte

Rev L.E. Brandt and Rev van Warmeloo

of the Dutch Reformed Church

Adv J de V Roos, 1884-1940

auditor-general of the Union of South Africa, 1918–1929

Muller and Van Belkum Collection

part of the library of the Nederduitsch Hervormde Kerk donated by Prof S.P Engelbrecht in 1923

Lutherse Seminarium

donated by the Holland-Zuid-Afrikaanse Unie in 1939

Sir J H Brand

President of the Orange Free State, 1864–1888

T.F. Burgers

President of Transvaal, 1872–1877

Pamphlet collection

A pamphlet collection consisting of approximately 22 000 items covering a wide range of subjects is housed at Special Collections.  Some of these pamphlets date from the late 19th century and early 20th century.  The collection is in the process of being catalogued on UPExplore.

Non-Africana

Non-Africana works published before 1870 are kept in the ZBR (Brandkluis) Collection. Fine examples are:  Ceremonies and religious customs of various nations of the known world vols 1 &  2, published 1734, and Bibliorum Sacrorum a 17th-century religious text in Hebrew, Greek and Latin.

Jurriaanse (JUR) Collection 

Kept separately in its own room, is the Jurriaanse (JUR) Collection. Dr Aardt Jurriaanse, a Dutchman, studied medicine in the Netherlands and came to South Africa during the Anglo Boer War with a medical corps in aid of the Boers. He stayed on in South Africa after the war and worked as a general practitioner in the Ermelo, Mpumalanga district of the old Transvaal where he also farmed until the end of his life. His collection of books covers the classics in literature and medicine.

UP Publications (TUK) 

A collection of publications by the staff, research units/student bodies or any association / organization of the University of Pretoria, also forms part of Special Collections. All publications that deal with the University of Pretoria or publications that were published with financial assistance from the University of Pretoria, are also included in this collection.

Masters and Doctoral research outputs of University of Pretoria students are regarded and preserved, as special UP Publications. This collection contains a copy of each and every dissertation/thesis by Masters and Doctoral students enrolled at all the faculties at the University of Pretoria. In 2004 it became the policy of the University of Pretoria that a student must submit a bound paper copy as well as two electronic copies of the approved dissertation/thesis. Since then the electronic copy is regarded as the preservation copy.

Netherlands Cultural History Library (KHI & KHN) Collection 

The collection is the most extensive Dutch collection in the Southern Hemisphere and consists of approximately 40 000 books and 40 000 journals covering all disciplines. Most of the old and rare books of this collection published before 1900 have been catalogued on UPExplore. and separated from the main collection. These books are identified with the prefix KHIN. Some of the modern works have been integrated with the general collection of the Academic Information Service, while the rest are housed in the Old Merensky Library. They are accessible only via a card catalogue, but are in the process of being catalogued on UPExplore.

The R.M. Titlestad Collection of Norwegian Literature 

Professor P.J.H. Titlestad, retired Head of the Department of English, donated this collection in 2007.  The collection, a substantial part of which includes Norwegian verse and the works of Henrik Ibsen and Knut Hamsun, was begun by the donator's father, Prof R.M. Titlestad (1899–1983) Head of the English Department at UP from 1943–1960, and later supplemented by the books of his friend, Leif Egeland.

Reserves (RES) 

Interesting items in this collection are first edition facsimiles of the Gutenberg Bible and Leonardo da Vinci's Notebooks . This collection was home to the works that were X-rated during the Apartheid years, i.e. books censored by the government, because they were considered subversive or pornographic. Currently it consists of  "high risk" books which are placed in the collection at the request of information specialists.

Digital Collections 

These collections can be viewed on Upspace, the digital research repository of the University of Pretoria. They include material of architectural archaeological and historical interest.

Notes

External links
University of Pretoria
University of Pretoria, Library Services
UPSpace
Special Collections

University of Pretoria library
Special collections libraries